Oreodera seabrai is a species of beetle in the family Cerambycidae. It was described by Monné and Fragoso in 1988.

References

Oreodera
Beetles described in 1988